Janice Maurine Pennington (born July 8, 1942) is an American former model and was one of the original "Barker's Beauties" models on The Price Is Right. As its longest-running model, Pennington was with The Price Is Right from the show's premiere in 1972 until 2000. She was also Playboy magazine's Playmate of the Month for the May 1971 issue. She is the older sister of fellow model Ann Pennington and the cofounder of the Hollywood Film Festival.

Personal life 
Pennington was born in Seattle, Washington. She has been married three times, and her first marriage was to Glenn Jacobson, with whom she appeared in a Spring 1967 episode (exact date unknown) of the daytime version of To Tell the Truth.

Her second husband was German mountain climber Friedrich "Fritz" Stammberger, who disappeared in Afghanistan in 1975 while mountain climbing. After years of searching, Pennington speculated that Fritz had been helping the CIA establish mountain bases along the Afghanistan-Pakistan border and was killed during a battle with Soviet forces.

In 1984, Pennington married writer Carlos de Abreu, a native of Mozambique.

Pennington was a member of a music group called The Models who released a single in 1967.

The Price Is Right 
For 29 years, Pennington served as a model on The Price Is Right, handing the microphone to Bob Barker at the start of more than 5,000 shows. She also handed off to Dennis James and Tom Kennedy while the show was in syndication in 1972–77 and 1985–86, respectively.

During a 1976 syndicated episode, host Dennis James called the mountain-climber character in the Cliff Hangers game Fritz, unaware that Pennington's husband Fritz Stammberger had disappeared while mountain climbing in the mid-1970s. As the contestant lost the game and the mountain-climber figure tumbled over the cliff, James shouted "There goes Fritz!," causing Pennington to run from the stage in tears.

In June 1988, a camera hit Pennington, knocking her unconscious. She was taken to a hospital and taping of the episode resumed after 45 minutes. Pennington's resulting surgery left her with scars and one shoulder shorter than the other; as a result, she could no longer wear swimsuits on the show. A substitute model took Pennington's place during her recovery from the injury.

Pennington's last episode of The Price Is Right was the December 13, 2000, episode following the show's takeover by Pearson Television earlier in the year. She signed a confidential settlement agreement.

See also 
 List of people in Playboy 1970–1979

References

External links 
 

1942 births
Living people
Game show models
1970s Playboy Playmates
People from Seattle